The William Esper Studio was founded in 1965 as a school for the performing arts in Manhattan, New York. The school is dedicated to the acting technique of Sanford Meisner. Its founder, William "Bill" Esper, is occasionally referred to as the best-known of Meisner's first generation teachers.

The William Esper Studio was listed as one of The 25 Best Drama Schools for a Master of Fine Arts numerous times.

Background
When Esper was a young man, he saw Eli Wallach and Maureen Stapleton in a touring production of The Rose Tattoo.

As Esper later recounted: "[I] was so struck by the acting ...[A]fter the play was over, I decided to go around the corner to get a cup of coffee so I could think about it some more. I walked into a little drugstore, and Eli was sitting there having a bite to eat..."

Esper talked to the actor, and Wallach told him he had studied at Sanford Meisner's Neighborhood Playhouse School of the Theatre. After graduating Case Western Reserve University in his native Ohio, Esper moved to New York City and began studying with Meisner, who was famous for his repetition exercise.

In 1962 Esper undertook training as a teacher and director with Meisner and proceeded to work closely with him for the next 15 years. Esper was on the staff of the Neighborhood Playhouse from 1965 to 1977 and Associate Director of the Playhouse Acting Department from 1974 to 1977.

In 1977 Esper also founded the BFA and MFA Professional Actor Training Programs at Rutgers University's Mason Gross School of the Arts. He led that department until 2004.

Esper has been a guest artist/teacher at Canada's Banff Festival of the Arts as well as at the National Theatre School of Canada, the St. Nicholas Theater in Chicago, Illinois, and the Schauspiel München School in Munich. Together with his wife Suzanne Esper, who also teaches at Esper Studios, he has conducted numerous workshops throughout Europe,  most notably at the National Film School of Denmark, the Norwegian National Academy of Theatre, and the National Theatre Mannheim. In 2008 Bill and Suzanne Esper introduced Meisner's work to Russia at the St. Petersburg State Academy of Theater.

Esper has worked extensively Off-Broadway and regionally.  He is a member of Ensemble Studio Theatre in New York. He was profiled in the book The New Generation of Acting Teachers, published by Viking Press in 1987. He is a past member of the National Board of the National Association of Schools of Theatre and a former Vice-President and Board Member of the University/Resident Theatre Association. He has lectured on acting at People′s Light and Theatre Company and the Screen Actors Guild Conservatory, New York City; SAG honored him with a Certificate of Achievement for his service to the profession. In 2011 Esper received the Association for Theatre in Higher Education (ATHE)'s Lifetime Achievement in Academic Theatre Award. In 2013 he was inducted into the College of Fellows of the American Theatre.

Esper died January 26, 2019. The studio is currently led by his widow Suzanne, who also was trained by Sanford Meisner both as an actor and a teacher alongside Esper.

Notable alumni

In 1965 Esper founded his eponymous studio. Among those he and his wife have coached and taught are:

 Mamoudou Athie
 Katherine Bailess
 Kim Basinger
 Kathy Bates
 Jennifer Beals
 Larry David
 Kristin Davis
 Kim Delaney
 Sofia Black-D'Elia
 Aaron Eckhart
 Michael Esper
 Peter Gallagher
 Jeff Goldblum
 Steven Adly Guirgis
 Laura Harrier
 Maryam Hassouni
 Patricia Heaton
 Dulé Hill
 William Hurt
 Christine Lahti
 John Malkovich
 Wendie Malick
 Marc Menchaca
 Michael Lombardi (actor)
 Gretchen Mol
 David Morse
 Timothy Olyphant
 Tonya Pinkins
 Maria Pitillo
 Sam Rockwell
 Tracee Ellis Ross
 Richard Schiff
 Amy Schumer
 Paul Sorvino
 Mary Steenburgen
 Dean Winters
 Ramy Youssef
 Deborah Van Valkenburgh

Associated publications
 The Actor's Art & Craft, by William Esper and Damon DiMarco, featuring a preface by David Mamet (2008) 
 The Actor's Guide to Creating a Character, by William Esper and Damon DiMarco (2014)

References

External links

Educational institutions established in 1965
Drama schools in the United States
Education in Manhattan
1965 establishments in New York City
Theatre in New York City